Charleston is a village in the South Island of New Zealand located 30 km south of Westport. It was founded as a goldmining town after a major goldrush in 1867, and is now an adventure tourist village noted for its extensive limestone caves and caving experiences. Guided tours of the nearby Metro Cave / Te Ananui Cave are operated out of Charleston and travel up the Waitakere / Nile River valley.

History 
Charleston's origins owe much to gold prospector William Fox. He was born in Ireland in about 1826 and as a young man became a sailor, then a gold prospector.

In 1862 Bill Fox's prospecting activities in the Arrow district excited intense interest. In 1864, Fox travelled to the West Coast. He prospected widely for gold and first discovered it at Fox Creek, a tributary of the Arahura River behind Hokitika, in January 1865.

According to local historian Les Wright, in July 1866 Fox organised a prospecting voyage to what was later named Fox River but didn't find gold there. He led the party on 20 km north to where Charleston would later be, but although they found gold in the sand there, it was too fine to save. So Fox went south to Ōkārito to find out how the miners there were extracting it from fine sand.

In August 1866, while Fox was away,  took the credit for the Pakihi ('Parkeese') field which later became known as the Charleston field. At first, goods going to 'Parkeese' were landed at Woodpecker Bay, south of Fox River, and humped about 20 km north to the goldfield.  Then Capt Charles Bonner managed to squeeze the ketch 'Constant' into a tiny bay near 'Parkeese' and the town that formed around this new landing spot, Constant Bay, was named Charleston, probably in his honour. Reed (2002) indicates that the community was originally known as 'Charlie's Town', and then 'Charles Town', before settling on the current name. Unlike its more famous American namesake, the town's name is generally pronounced with three syllables.

In November 1866 Fox made a rich strike at Brighton (now Tiromoana), about 10 miles south of Charleston, and in May 1867 a strike near Charleston itself precipitated the last real 'rush' on the West Coast. Brighton was a much bigger town at the start, but Charleston lasted longer and the two have been confused in places. In 1867 Brighton and its environs had 53 hotels while Charleston had 37. However, in 1975-79 remains of around 99 hotels where found by old bottle collectors in the Charleston area which have been documented, with the European hotel the last surviving hotel which was pulled down after the 100 year festivities around 1968. Hannahs shoe shop chain had the very first shop in Charleston in 1867.  Marys hotel at the south end of the nine mile beach to the north of Charleston being said to be gateway to Charleston which was also pulled down around 1970. Open cast Coal mines replaced gold mining in Charleston with the Mowarts mine and latter the McGlockland mine which supplied coal to nearby Westport, Gold was still mined on the south end of the nine mile beach up till the late 1970s.
In 1990s the seals from Cape Foulwind near Westport moved south to the Charleston coast and made camp at the mouth of the Bromielaw creek about 2 km south of Constant bay. Three ship wrecks have been located around the mouths of both Constant bay and its neighbour Joyce bay which are believed to be from the gold rush times.
Charleston was the site for the first cement buildings in New Zealand; a Butter factory and a small house which still stands around 3 km south of Charleston next to Cake hill. The Waitakere / Nile river still has the Cement walls on the river of the old swing bridge which was the main road through the coast in 1899. Charleston is littered with old gold workings and one should watch for old mining shafts which are hidden throughout the area.  Charleston has got coal, clay, and sandstone deposits which all have been mined over the years. Wellington's post master got a promotion to the Charleston Post office in 1867 which was a big step up in his career at the time.
The Charleston school was moved to the Westport south school and the old school teacher's house (which still stands) was also the Charleston Police station and Charleston jail beforehand.     

The population of Charleston during the goldrush is often exaggerated with 30,000 or even 100,000 being mentioned. At the peak of the gold rush, the population of the entire West Coast is believed to have been only 35,000. The early 1867 census, at the peak of the Charleston rush, showed 5,000 on the entire Charleston field and 6,000 on the Brighton field ten miles to the south.

Geography 
The Waitakere or Nile River emerges just north of Charleston from an area rich in limestone cliffs and caves. Cave and rafting tours operate from Charleston into the Nile River valley, including a short bush tram track for part of the transport.
The Fox River 30 km south of Charleston is named after William Fox.

Demographics

The statistical area of Charleston (Buller District), which at 1017 square kilometres is much larger than the village, had a population of 522 at the 2018 New Zealand census, a decrease of 135 people (-20.5%) since the 2013 census, and an increase of 6 people (1.2%) since the 2006 census. There were 225 households. There were 264 males and 258 females, giving a sex ratio of 1.02 males per female. The median age was 48.7 years (compared with 37.4 years nationally), with 75 people (14.4%) aged under 15 years, 69 (13.2%) aged 15 to 29, 288 (55.2%) aged 30 to 64, and 93 (17.8%) aged 65 or older.

Ethnicities were 93.1% European/Pākehā, 8.6% Māori, 0.6% Pacific peoples, 2.3% Asian, and 2.3% other ethnicities (totals add to more than 100% since people could identify with multiple ethnicities).

The proportion of people born overseas was 15.5%, compared with 27.1% nationally.

Although some people objected to giving their religion, 56.3% had no religion, 29.9% were Christian, 0.6% were Hindu, 1.1% were Muslim, 1.1% were Buddhist and 2.9% had other religions.

Of those at least 15 years old, 78 (17.4%) people had a bachelor or higher degree, and 96 (21.5%) people had no formal qualifications. The median income was $26,500, compared with $31,800 nationally. The employment status of those at least 15 was that 225 (50.3%) people were employed full-time, 87 (19.5%) were part-time, and 9 (2.0%) were unemployed.

References

External links

Buller District
Ghost towns in the West Coast, New Zealand
Tourist attractions in the West Coast, New Zealand
1867 establishments in New Zealand
Populated places established in 1867
West Coast Gold Rush